Enrique Fernández (born 11 March 1953 as Luis Enrique Fernández Marta in Melo, Uruguay) is a Uruguayan film director. He became famous for the 2007 film The Pope's Toilet, which he directed together with César Charlone.

References

External links

1953 births
Living people
People from Melo, Uruguay
Uruguayan film directors